Draconus is an action-adventure platform game developed and published by Zeppelin Games in 1988. It was released for the Atari 8-bit family, Commodore 64, and ZX Spectrum. Draconus is similar to Metroid.

Gameplay 

The player assumes the role of the hero, Frognum, whose task it is to reclaim his kingdom from the Tyrant beast. The game style is principally a platformer which finds the player running and jumping through various screens, numbering around a hundred. Many of the rooms include enemies, which generally follow fixed paths but may also swarm and chase the player. The player starts the game with two weapons: fire breath which is limited but may be replenished by collecting items, and a punch which is unlimited. Once destroyed, enemies do not respawn except in the C64 version, where they can respawn if a room that was only partly cleared is revisited. The main task is to find four special abilities and then face the final battle.

Enemy contact reduces Frognum's life energy, which may be refilled by collectible symbols. On loss of all life energy Frognum loses one life and restarts from the last Record slab. These slabs occur throughout the game world and serve as checkpoints. Impacting upon water whilst in a humanoid form generally results in immediate death, as does falling large distances or touching spikes.

Reception

The game twice placed #1 in the Readers' Top Ten of the German Atari Magazin.

References

External links 
Draconus at Atari Mania

Platform games
1988 video games
Atari 8-bit family games
Commodore 64 games
Video games developed in the United Kingdom
ZX Spectrum games
Metroidvania games